Arrow Lakes Hospital is a six-bed hospital facility, located in Nakusp, British Columbia. The hospital is owned and operated by Interior Health in the Kootney Boundary Health Service Area.

History 
In 2018, the provincial government announced $2.1 million for upgrades to the hospital including new triage facilities, trauma bays and renovation to existing patient exam bays.

Services
The hospital serves the village and the nearby communities including Edgewood, New Denver and Slocan.

It services include:

 Laboratory and radiology (x-ray) services 
 24/7 Emergency services
 Acute-care beds for patient admissions for general medicine, observation, assessment, convalescence and palliative care 
 Low-risk obstetrical care 
 Outpatient ambulatory-care procedures 
 Physiotherapy and some clinics and programs including diabetic education, nutrition consultation, respiratory, cancer-diagnosis support, limited chemotherapy, pastoral care and hospice

References

Arrow Lakes
Hospitals in British Columbia
Heliports in Canada
Certified airports in British Columbia